Chris Walrus Dalzell (born 1986 or 1987) is an Australian artist from Canberra who has gained fame for: a style he calls Spiraleyes; his contributions to Art, Not Apart and various other art projects; and his Spider Web Street Art, which he paints in public places on a clear wall of pallet wrap stretched between street poles.

References

Further reading

External links
Art by Walrus

Living people
Australian artists
Street artists
Street art in Australia
People from Canberra
1980s births